Elysius lavinia is a moth of the family Erebidae first described by Herbert Druce in 1906. It is found in Peru.

References

Moths described in 1906
lavinia
Moths of South America